Philip d'Aubigny Keith-Roach was the rugby union scrum coach to the 2003 Rugby World Cup-winning England team.

He previously coached Surrey County, Rosslyn Park F.C. and London Division before being appointed as the first full-time professional scrummaging coach in the UK, first at Wasps RFC and then with England.

Keith-Roach was born 11 August 1945 in Jerusalem where his Father, Edward Keith-Roach, was the District Commissioner. He was Educated at Cheltenham, St Luke’s College Exeter and Pembroke College, Cambridge.

Career
Keith-Roach worked with three England head coaches: Jack Rowell, Clive Woodward and Andy Robinson. He was involved in 113 international matches between 1995 and 2007. He went on to coach Sale Sharks in the English Premiership, Stade Français in the French Top 14, to assist the Russian national team and to act as scrum consultant to English international referee Wayne Barnes.

He also advised Toulon (RC Toulonnais) during their European Cup campaigns, Cambridge University prior to The Varsity Match and Doncaster Knights in the Championship.

A three times Cambridge Blue (university sport) as a Hooker, he also played for Stroud, Gloucester, Rosslyn Park, Eastern Counties, London Division and Barbarians FC during a 22 year playing career. An England trialist in 1969, he was reserve Hooker for England v South Africa and on various occasions in the 1970s

After leaving University he taught at Trinity School Croydon and later at Dulwich College. Whilst at Dulwich PKR was involved with the launch of Rhino Rugby the Scrum machine manufacturers before switching to full time coaching when rugby union became openly professional in 1995.

Keith-Roach was present at all three England World Cup winning victories: the football World Cup final in 1966, the rugby World Cup final in 2003 as England scrum coach, and the cricket World Cup final in 2019.

References

External links
Rugby's nearly men deemed good enough to play for their country - but without a cap to show for it. The Telegraph. February 2019
Is England’s scrum doomed ahead of the World Cup? The architect of the 2003 world beaters shares his view. The Rugby Paper. September 2018
Lions must front up says Keith-Roach. The Independent
Scrummaging rules are 'putting lives at risk'. The Telegraph
Coaching Notebook. The Guardian
Keith-Roach will help Sharks push for glory. Manchester Evening News
Why France's Rabah Slimani is the perfect prop forward. The Telegraph. March 2018
Great White. The Telegraph

English rugby union coaches
English rugby union players
Living people
Rosslyn Park F.C. players
Year of birth missing (living people)